Bic or BIC may refer to:

Places
 Le Bic, Rimouski, Quebec, Canada, a community merged into Rimouski in 2009
 Bic National Park, near Le Bic
 Bîc River, Moldova
 Bîc, a village in Bubuieci commune of the Chișinău municipality, Moldova
 Bic, a village administered by Șimleu Silvaniei town, Sălaj County, Romania
 Bić, a mountain in Serbia

People
 Bic Runga, stage name of New Zealand musician Briolette Kah Bic Runga (born 1976)
 Blue Ivy Carter (born 2012), stage name B.I.C., daughter of musicians Beyoncé and Jay-Z
 Christian Hayes (born 1964), British musician also known as Bic Hayes

BIC
 Bahá'í International Community, an international non-governmental organization for the Bahá'í faith
 Bayesian information criterion, a statistical measure for choosing between models
 Bournemouth International Centre, commonly known as the BIC
 Bahrain International Circuit, motor-racing circuit
 Buddh International Circuit, Indian motor-racing circuit
 Bien de Interés Cultural, a category of the Spanish heritage register
 Brachium of inferior colliculus, a neural pathway
 Bureau International des Containers, responsible for the reporting mark on ISO-Containers

Other uses
 Bic Camera, Japanese electronics retailer
 Bic cycling team
 Société Bic, French manufacturer of pens, cigarette lighters, razors, and watersports equipment
 Bic Cristal, ballpoint pen, more commonly known as a Bic pen
 Burroughs Interchange Code, BIC (character encoding), a derivative of the BCD character encoding
 Business Identifier Code or Bank Identifier Code (also known as ISO 9362 code), an identification code for financial and other institutions

See also
 Bik (disambiguation)
 Bick (disambiguation)